Milnathort railway station served the town of Milnathort, Perth and Kinross, Scotland, from 1858 to 1964 on the Fife and Kinross Line.

History 
The station opened on 15 March 1858 by the North British Railway. To the north was the goods yard which had a goods shed and a siding which served Orwell Vale Mill. A signal box opened in 1890 which was situated to the northeast. There was initially a locomotive shed to the east which was later removed and a goods yard to the south which was later replaced. The station closed on 15 June 1964.

References

External links 

Disused railway stations in Perth and Kinross
Former North British Railway stations
Beeching closures in Scotland
Railway stations in Great Britain opened in 1858
Railway stations in Great Britain closed in 1964
1858 establishments in Scotland
1964 disestablishments in Scotland